Masayoshi Uchida (7 January 1898 – 14 February 1945) was a Japanese swimmer. He competed in two swimming events and the diving at the 1920 Summer Olympics. He was killed in action during World War II.

References

External links
 

1898 births
1945 deaths
Japanese male divers
Japanese male freestyle swimmers
Olympic divers of Japan
Olympic swimmers of Japan
Divers at the 1920 Summer Olympics
Swimmers at the 1920 Summer Olympics
People from Hamamatsu
Japanese military personnel killed in World War II
Japanese military personnel of World War II
20th-century Japanese people